The Billings Metropolitan Area is served by two major news television stations, four major non-news television stations, one community television station, 25 commercial radio stations and one major daily newspaper. Note:  Community 7 is only available through cable or satellite.

Television stations

Newspapers

Billings Gazette
The Billings Gazette was first published in 1885 and has since grown to become the largest newspaper in Montana and Northern Wyoming. The Billings Gazette is published as a daily newspaper and also publishes Billings Business, Thrifty Nickel, Magic City Magazine, Montana Land Magazine, Welcome Home, and Lifewise to target niche audiences. The Billings Gazette is currently owned by Lee Enterprises.

Billings Outpost

Founded in 1997, Billings Outpost is a weekly newspaper, distributed in Billings and nearby municipalities.

The Billings Times
The Billings Times is a weekly legal/statistical newspaper that was established in 1891. The newspaper reports on legal publications and also reports vital statistics, such as births, deaths, and marriages, in the Yellowstone County Area. It also advertises all major city contracts for the City of Billings. Since 1960, the newspaper has been operated by the Turner Family.

Radio stations

FM

AM

References

 
Billings